In the human body, the lateral sacrococcygeal ligaments is a pair of ligaments stretching from the lower lateral angles of the sacrum to the transverse processes of the first coccygeal vertebra.

Together with the anterior, posterior, and intercornual sacrococcygeal ligaments, they stabilize the sacrococcygeal symphysis, i.e. the joint between the sacrum and the coccyx.

They complete the foramina for the last sacral nerve.

There are up to three lateral sacrococcygeal ligaments on either side of the sacral hiatus.

See also 
 Anococcygeal raphé
 Coccydynia (coccyx pain, tailbone pain)
 Ganglion impar

Notes

References 
 
 
  (An illustration of the posterior and lateral ligaments.)

Ligaments of the torso